Rabdophaga rosariella is a species of gall midge which forms galls on sallows (Salix species). It was first described by Jean-Jacques Kieffer in 1897.

Description
The gall is a small rosette, most often in an axillary bud on sallows. In Britain sallow usually refers to S. aurita, S caprea, [[Salix cinerea|S. cinerea]] and the hybrids between these species. The rosette leaves are not obviously hairy and the full grown larva does not have a sternal spatula (i.e. a structure on the underside of the thorax of the final (third) instar larva of Cecidomyiidae). Larvae of R. rosariella are unique as all other known Rabdophaga'' larvae have a sternal spatula.

Distribution
Recorded from Belgium and Great Britain.

References

rosariella
Nematoceran flies of Europe
Gall-inducing insects
Insects described in 1897
Taxa named by Jean-Jacques Kieffer
Willow galls